Women's 52 kg competition in judo at the 2004 Summer Olympics was held on August 15 at the Ano Liossia Olympic Hall.

This event was the second-lightest of the women's judo weight classes, limiting competitors to a maximum of 52 kilograms of body mass. Like all other judo events, bouts lasted five minutes. If the bout was still tied at the end, it was extended for another five-minute, sudden-death period; if neither judoka scored during that period, the match was decided by the judges. The tournament bracket consisted of a single-elimination contest culminating in a gold medal match. There was also a repechage to determine the winners of the two bronze medals. Each judoka who had lost to a semifinalist competed in the repechage. The two judokas who lost in the semifinals faced the winner of the opposite half of the bracket's repechage in bronze medal bouts.

Schedule 
All times are Greece Standard Time (UTC+2)

Qualifying athletes

Tournament results

Final

Mat 1

Mat 2

Repechage
Those judoka eliminated in earlier rounds by the four semifinalists of the main bracket advanced to the repechage.  These matches determined the two bronze medalists for the event.

References

 Yahoo! Sports Athens 2004 Summer Olympics Judo Results

External links
 

W52
Judo at the Summer Olympics Women's Half Lightweight
Olympics W52
Women's events at the 2004 Summer Olympics